Dendropsophus elianeae is a species of frog in the family Hylidae.
It is found in Brazil and possibly Paraguay.
Its natural habitats are moist savanna, subtropical or tropical moist shrubland, freshwater marshes, and intermittent freshwater marshes.
It is threatened by habitat loss.

References

elianeae
Amphibians described in 2000
Taxonomy articles created by Polbot